Oswald Martyn (10 January 1887 – 14 September 1959) was an English cricketer who played for Essex. He was born in Clapham and died in Patcham.

Martyn represented Essex in one first-class match, against Northamptonshire during the 1922 County Championship season. An upper-middle order batsman, his sole contribution to the match was a duck with the bat in the Essex first innings.

External links
Oswald Martyn at Cricket Archive 

1887 births
1959 deaths
English cricketers
Essex cricketers